The 2017 Marshall Thundering Herd football team represented Marshall University in the 2017 NCAA Division I FBS football season. The Thundering Herd played their home games at the Joan C. Edwards Stadium in Huntington, West Virginia, and competed in the East Division of Conference USA (C–USA). They were led by eighth-year head coach Doc Holliday. They finished the season 8–5, 4–4 in C-USA play to finish in a three-way tie for third place in the East Division. They were invited to the New Mexico Bowl where they defeated Colorado State.

Schedule
Marshall announced its 2017 football schedule on January 26, 2017. The 2017 schedule consists of 6 home and away games in the regular season. The Thundering Herd will host CUSA foes FIU, Old Dominion, Southern Miss, and Western Kentucky (WKU), and will travel to Charlotte, Florida Atlantic, Middle Tennessee, and UTSA.

The Thundering Herd will host two of the four non-conference opponents, Kent State and Miami of Ohio, both from the Mid-American Conference and travel to Cincinnati of the American Athletic Conference and NC State of the Atlantic Coast Conference.

Schedule Source:

Game summaries

Miami (OH)

at NC State

Kent State

at Cincinnati

at Charlotte

Old Dominion

at Middle Tennessee

FIU

at Florida Atlantic

Western Kentucky

at UTSA

Southern Miss

Colorado State–Gildan New Mexico Bowl

References

Marshall
Marshall Thundering Herd football seasons
New Mexico Bowl champion seasons
Marshall Thundering Herd football